Mountain Air Park is an unincorporated community in Clackamas County, Oregon, United States, served by the Brightwood, Oregon 97011 post office. It is on Mount Hood Highway 26 northwest of Mount Hood Village, Oregon near Wildwood Recreation Site.

References

Unincorporated communities in Clackamas County, Oregon
Unincorporated communities in Oregon